Rabbi Mark Dratch is the founder of JSafe (The Jewish Institute Supporting an Abuse-Free Environment).  In 2010 he was named as one of Newsweek's Top 50 Rabbis in America.  He was number 13 on Newsweek's list in 2013. He was married to Sarah Lamm (d. 2013), the daughter of Rabbi Norman Lamm, the long-time  Chancellor of Yeshiva University. In December, 2017 he married Rachel Levitt Klein.

Education
Dratch is a graduate of Yeshiva University (Yeshiva College, 1979; RIETS (rabbinic ordination), 1982; Ferkauf Graduate School (Jewish Education), 1982); and received an MSW from Wurzweiler School of Social Work (2012).

Rabbinical Council of America
In September, 2012, Mark Dratch was appointed as Executive Vice President of the Rabbinical Council of America.

Positions
Dratch served as a congregational rabbi for 22 years.  Congregations include: Congregation Agudath Sholom, Stamford, Connecticut;  Shaarei Shomayim Congregation,  Toronto, Ontario; Congregation Kehilath Jeshurun, New York, New York; Boca Raton Synagogue, Boca Raton, Florida (Dratch was the founding Rabbi); Congregation Beth Israel, Schenectady, New York. He also served as the Webbe Rebbe - answering "Ask the rabbi" questions addressed to the Orthodox Union on its web site.

He was a Vice President of the Rabbinical Council of America, served as chairman of its task force on rabbinic improprieties and was responsible for spearheading and formulating policy guidelines for responding to allegations against member rabbis.  He was a member of the RCA Executive Board and a member of the Orthodox Caucus.

He was an Instructor of Jewish Studies and Philosophy at the Isaac Breuer College of Yeshiva University and the camp Rabbi of Camp Morasha.

Publications
Dratch has published articles, in English and Hebrew-language journals, on the interface between Jewish law and contemporary society. He wrote a series of articles on Jewish ethical issues for the Ethics Project of the Orthodox Caucus.
His chapter, "A Community of Co-Enablers: Why Are Jews Ignoring Traditional Jewish Law by Protecting the Abuser?" appears in "Tempest in the Temple: Jewish Communities and Child Sex Scandals" A. Neustein, ed. (Brandeis University Press, 2009) and his chapter, "I Do? Consent And Coercion in Sexual Relations" appears in "Rav Chesed: Essays in Honor of Rabbi Dr. Haskel Lookstein," R. Medoff, ed., (Ktav, 2009).  His paper dealing with the Jewish views on domestic violence was originally distributed through the Rabbinical Council.

Domestic Violence and Sexual Abuse
In 2005, Rabbi Dratch founded JSafe: The Jewish Institute Supporting an Abuse Free Environment for which he served as CEO until his appointintment as Executive Vice President of the Rabbinical Council of America. Dratch was a member of the Clergy Task Force on Abuse of Jewish Women International, a member of the Leadership Time of the FaithTrust Institute, a member of the Editorial Board of the (now defunct) Journal of Religion and Abuse.  He also lectures on matters of domestic violence, child abuse, and professional abuse in the Jewish community.

See also
Takana

References

American Modern Orthodox rabbis
Jewish activists
Anti-domestic violence activists
Judaism and women
People from Fairfield County, Connecticut
Yeshiva University alumni
Year of birth missing (living people)
Living people
20th-century American rabbis
21st-century American rabbis